Lift Every Voice is an album by jazz saxophonist Charles Lloyd recorded in February 2002 by Lloyd with Geri Allen, John Abercrombie, Marc Johnson, Larry Grenadier and Billy Hart. The album represents Lloyd's response to the 9/11 terrorist attacks.

Reception
The album received wide critical acclaim. The Allmusic review by Richard S. Ginell awarded the album 4½ stars and states "The result is one of the most unusual and deeply spiritual recordings in Lloyd's always-unusual career, one that says more with fewer means". The All About Jazz review by Mark Corroto stated "Lloyd’s belief in humanity and reliance on the healing and redemptive qualities of music propels this compassionate recording".

Track listing
All compositions by Charles Lloyd except as indicated.

Disc One:
 "Hymn to the Mother" - 15:00  
 "You Are So Beautiful" (Bruce Fisher, Billy Preston) - 4:05  
 "Amazing Grace" (John Newton) - 4:46  
 "East Virginia, West Memphis" - 9:40  
 "What's Going On" (Renaldo "Obie" Benson, Al Cleveland, Marvin Gaye) - 5:09  
 "Angel Oak" - 3:35  
 "Te Amaré" (Silvio Rodríguez) - 6:49  
 "I'm Afraid" (Duke Ellington) - 7:41  
 "Hafez, Shattered Heart" - 4:43

Disc Two:  
 "Rabo de Nube" (Rodríguez) - 7:07  
 "Blood Count" (Billy Strayhorn) - 5:08  
 "Go Down Moses" (Traditional) - 10:39  
 "Beyond Darkness" - 7:51  
 "Nocturne" - 6:13  
 Wayfaring Stranger" (Traditional) - 8:40  
 "Deep River" (Traditional) - 6:27  
 "Lift Every Voice and Sing" (James Weldon Johnson, John Rosamond Johnson) - 3:10  
 "Prayer, The Crossing" - 14:03

Personnel
Charles Lloyd - tenor saxophone, flute, tarogato
Geri Allen - piano
John Abercrombie - guitar
Marc Johnson - double bass (CD1 #1, 3-7; CD2 #1, 3, 5, 9)
Larry Grenadier - double bass (CD1 #2, 8; CD2 #2, 4-8)
Billy Hart - drums

References

2002 albums
ECM Records albums
Charles Lloyd (jazz musician) albums